Bob Neal may refer to:

Bob Neal (Atlanta sportscaster) (born 1942), television sportscaster based in Atlanta, Georgia, known for his work covering NBA games for TNT and TBS
Bob Neal (Cleveland sportscaster) (1916–1983), former radio and television broadcaster for the Cleveland Indians and the Cleveland Browns
Bob Neal (promoter), country music promoter

See also
Bob Neill (born 1952), British politician and barrister
Robert Neale (disambiguation)
Robert Neill (disambiguation)